The Accord of Winchester is the 11th-century document that establishes the primacy of the archbishop of Canterbury over the archbishop of York.

It originated in a dispute over primacy between Thomas, the archbishop of York, and Lanfranc, the new Norman archbishop of Canterbury, soon after the latter had taken office.  The case was first heard by King William I at the old Saxon royal capital of Winchester at Easter (8 April) 1072, in the royal chapel in the castle. It was then heard at Windsor at Pentecost (27 May), where the final settlement was made, with William deciding in Lanfranc's favour, and formalized in this document.

This did not end the Canterbury–York dispute over the primacy, as it continued for a number of years after this.

Signatories

When King William and Queen Matilda signed the document with crosses, it did not necessarily mean they were unused to writing, infirm or even illiterate. They and all the bishops signed with crosses, as illiterate people would later do, but they did so in accordance with current legal practice, not because they or the bishops could not write their own names.

It (in the CCA-DCc-ChAnt/A/2 version) was also signed by 
the Archbishop of Canterbury 
the Archbishop of York, who signed '' (I concede), unlike all the other signatories, who signed '' (I subscribe)
Wulfstan, bishop of Worcester
Walkelin, bishop of Winchester
Remigius de Fécamp, bishop of Lincoln, who had moved his seat to that city earlier that year
Herfast, bishop of Thetford
Hubert, 'lector' of the Roman Church and papal legate of Pope Alexander II (the pope who had backed King William's invasion of England and had backed Lanfranc in the dispute)

and additionally, in the CCA-DCc-ChAnt/A/1 version, :
William, bishop of London
Hereman, bishop of Sherborne
Walter, bishop of Hereford
Giso, bishop of Wells
Stigand, bishop of Chichester
Siward, bishop of Rochester
Osbern FitzOsbern, bishop of Exeter
Odo, bishop of Bayeux, earl of Kent
Geoffrey, bishop of Coutances, one of the nobles ('primates') of the English
Scotland ('Scolland'), abbot of St Augustine's Abbey, Canterbury
Aelfwine, abbot of Ramsey Abbey
Aethelnoth ('Elnodus'), abbot of Glastonbury Abbey
Thurstan, abbot of Ely Abbey
Wulfwold, abbot of Chertsey Abbey
Elwin ('Eluuius' [also known as Æthelwig]), abbot of Evesham ('hevesand)
Frederick, abbot of St Albans
Geoffrey, abbot of St Peter's, Westminster
Baldwin, abbot of Bury St Edmunds
Turold, abbot of Peterborough
Adelelm, abbot of Abingdon
Riwallon ('Rualodus'), abbot of Winchester New Minster

Both versions are endorsed with descriptions and marks in 13th century hands.

Copies
The main copies are held at the Canterbury Cathedral archives.(Catalogue entries for the CCA-DCc-ChAnt/A/1 version and the CCA-DCc-ChAnt/A/2 version)  There is also one at the British Library.

Versions
In the Canterbury Cathedral Archives:
CCA-DCc-Register E, f46r and CCA-DCc-Register I, ff60v-61r (sections of royal charters for liberties of the Church) 
CCA-DCc-ChAnt/A/2 (some significant variations)
In the British Library
BL Cotton Appendix 56, ff57r-58r

Notes

References
Discussions of the document, with transcriptions, summaries, notes, and photographs, can be found in:
D Whitelock, M Brett and C N L Brooke (eds), Councils and Synods, vol 1, part ii (Oxford, 1981), pp. 586–607 (including, pp. 594–5, a list of versions)
T A M Bishop and P Chaplais (eds), Facsimiles of English Royal Writs to AD 1100 (Oxford, 1957), plate xxix 
H W C Davis (ed), Regesta regum Anglo-Normannorum'' (Oxford, 1913), p17 
Historical Manuscripts Commission Fifth Report (London, 1876), Appendix, p. 452

Episcopacy in Anglicanism
History of Hampshire
Norman conquest of England
1072 in England
English manuscripts
Medieval documents of England
Texts of Anglo-Saxon England